Kevin Collins (born December 15, 1950 in Springfield, Massachusetts) is a retired National Hockey League linesman. His career started in 1971 and ended in 2005. He also worked the 1996 World Cup of Hockey, four Canada Cups and the 1998 Nagano Olympics. From the 1994-95 season until his retirement, he wore uniform number 50.

External links
Retired NHL Linesman Kevin Collins Honored
NHLOfficials.com bio on Kevin Collins

1950 births
Living people
National Hockey League officials
American International Yellow Jackets men's ice hockey players
American ice hockey officials
American men's ice hockey left wingers